Matt Balasavage (born February 15, 1989) is a former American football tight end. He played until his senior year at Temple,  declared for the 2012 NFL Draft and was undrafted. He currently resides in Lancaster, Pa with his wife, Anna and their children, Peyton, Luke and Emma.

College career
He played college football at Temple University.

Professional career

Baltimore Ravens
After going undrafted, he signed with the Baltimore Ravens. On August 31, 2012, he was placed on Injured Reserve due to an ankle injury. On September 4, 2012, he was released with an injury settlement.

References

External links 
 Temple Owls bio
 Baltimore Ravens bio

Living people
1989 births
Players of American football from Pennsylvania
Sportspeople from Lancaster, Pennsylvania
Temple Owls football players